The -minimum spanning tree problem, studied in theoretical computer science, asks for a tree of minimum cost that has exactly  vertices and forms a subgraph of a larger graph. It is also called the -MST or edge-weighted -cardinality tree. Finding this tree is NP-hard, but it can be approximated to within a constant approximation ratio in polynomial time.

Problem statement
The input to the problem consists of an undirected graph with weights on its edges, and a  The output is a tree with   vertices and  edges, with all of the edges of the output tree belonging to the input graph. The cost of the output is the sum of the weights of its edges, and the goal is to find the tree that has minimum cost.

Ravi et al. also considered a geometric version of the problem, which can be seen as a special case of the graph problem.
In the geometric -minimum spanning tree problem, the input is a set of points in the plane. That is, it is a graph -minimum spanning tree on a complete graph with Euclidean distances as weights.

Computational complexity
When  is a fixed constant, the -minimum spanning tree problem can be solved in polynomial time by a brute-force search algorithm that tries all -tuples of vertices.
However, for variable , the -minimum spanning tree problem has been shown to be NP-hard by a reduction from the Steiner tree problem.

The reduction takes as input an instance of the Steiner tree problem: a weighted graph, with a subset of its vertices selected as terminals. The goal of the Steiner tree problem is to connect these terminals by a tree whose weight is as small as possible. To transform this problem into an instance of the -minimum spanning tree problem,  attach to each terminal a tree of zero-weight edges with a large number  of vertices per tree. (For a graph with  vertices and  terminals, they use  added vertices per tree.) The only way to include this many vertices in a -spanning tree is to use at least one vertex from each added tree, for there are not enough vertices remaining if even one of the added trees is missed. Therefore, the -minimum spanning tree must be formed by combining the optimal Steiner tree with enough of the zero-weight edges of the added trees to make the total tree size large enough.

Even for a graph whose edge weights belong to the set }, testing whether the optimal solution value is less than a given threshold is NP-complete. It remains NP-complete for planar graphs. The geometric version of the problem is also NP-hard, but not known to belong to NP, because of the difficulty of comparing sums of square roots; instead it lies in the class of problems reducible to the existential theory of the reals.

The -minimum spanning tree may be found in polynomial time for graphs of bounded treewidth, and for graphs with only two distinct edge weights.

Approximation algorithms
Because of the high computational complexity of finding an optimal solution to the -minimum spanning tree, much of the research on the problem has instead concentrated on approximation algorithms for the problem. The goal of such algorithms is to find an approximate solution in polynomial time with a small approximation ratio. The approximation ratio is defined as the ratio of the computed solution length to the optimal length for a worst-case instance, one that maximizes this ratio. Because the NP-hardness reduction for the -minimum spanning tree problem preserves the weight of all solutions, it also preserves the hardness of approximation of the problem. In particular, because the Steiner tree problem is NP-hard to approximate to an approximation ratio better than 96/95, the same is true for the -minimum spanning tree problem.

References

External links
 Minimum k-spanning tree in "A compendium of NP optimization problems"
 KCTLIB, KCTLIB -- A Library for the Edge-Weighted K-Cardinality Tree Problem

Spanning tree
NP-hard problems